Parvaneh is a 2012 Swiss short drama film directed by Talkhon Hamzavi. It was nominated for the Academy Award for Best Live Action Short Film at the 87th Academy Awards.

Cast
 Brigitte Beyeler
 Cheryl Graf
 Nissa Kashani as Parvaneh
 Jana Pensa as Girl at a Party

References

External links
 
 

2012 films
2012 drama films
Swiss drama films
Swiss short films
2010s German-language films
2012 short films